Tillandsia may-patii is a species of flowering plant in the genus Tillandsia. This species is endemic to Mexico.

References

may-patii
Flora of Mexico